The Chicago State Cougars are the varsity athletic teams representing Chicago State University of Chicago, Illinois in intercollegiate athletics. The university currently sponsors 15 varsity teams. The Cougars compete in NCAA Division I as an independent. They were previously members of the Western Athletic Conference from 2013 to 2022.

History
Melvin Bland was the first CSU student athlete to gain NAIA All-American status in 1974 as a wrestler. Tyrone Everhart also was a NAIA Honorable Mention All-American wrestler the same year. Fred Evans as a sophomore became the first black swimmer ever to win a national championship in 1975. The Chicago State University Ice Hockey Team produced 2 NCAA Division 2 All-Americans in the 1975–76 season. George Hansen and Bob Janecyk were selected in 1975–76 to the NCAA (College Division) West All-American Team. Janecyk  was selected two more times designated as an NCAA (College Division) West All-American Team goaltender for CSU in 1976–77 and 1977–78. He went on to play for the Chicago Blackhawks of the National Hockey League.  The first NAIA District #20 Championship Team in any sport was the 1975 wrestling team, which captured the NAIA District #20 Championship coached by Dr. James G. Pappas. The Cougar Wrestling Team also won District #20 titles in 1976, 1977, 1978, 1979 and 1980.

In 1984, the CSU Men's Basketball Team captured third place at the NAIA National Championships. The team's performance throughout the tournament was as follows:

 Chicago State (Ill.) 79, Franklin Pierce (N.H.) 62
 Chicago State 105, Kearney State (Neb.) 104 2OT
 Chicago State 68, Chaminade (Hawaii) 66 (Quarterfinals)
 Fort Hays State (Kan.) 86, Chicago State 84 OT (Semifinals)
 Chicago State 86, Westmont (Calif.) 82 OT (3rd)

Chicago State joined the Western Athletic Conference on July 1, 2013 as part of a six-university expansion. Along with the University of Missouri–Kansas City (UMKC), it was to have anchored the circuit's Midwest division. UMKC left the conference in 2020 and Chicago State announced on January 14, 2021 that it would do likewise on June 30, 2022.

Conference affiliations
 1966–67 to 1976–77 – NAIA Independent
 1977–78 to 1980–81 – Chicagoland Collegiate Athletic Conference
 1981–82 to 1983–84 – NAIA Independent
 1984–85 to 1992–93 – NCAA Division I Independent
 1993–94 – East Coast Conference
 1994–95 to 2005–06 – Mid-Continent Conference
 2006–07 to 2008–09 – NCAA Division I Independent
 2009–10 to 2012–13 – Great West Conference
 2013–14 to 2021–22 – Western Athletic Conference
 2022–23 – NCAA Division I Independent
 2023–24 to Future – To be determined

Sports sponsored

With the school's current financial situation and the needs of the athletic program, in April 2016, the University Budget Committee recommended that the Athletic Department "... study the benefits of being Division 1 or another division." Chicago State University currently sponsors teams in seven men's and eight women's teams in NCAA sanctioned sports.

All-Americans
1974 – Vince Williams – All-American – 6th 220yd Dash Outdoor Track & Field
1974 – Sudie Davis, Vince Williams, Willie Patton, Clifford Fletcher, Wallace Hunter All-Americans NCAA Track and Field 
1974 – Melvin Bland – All-American – Third Team Wrestling
1975 – Fred Evans – All-American – Men's Swimming & Diving
1976 – Fred Evans – All-American – Men's Swimming & Diving
1976 – Scott White – All-American – Men's Swimming & Diving
1977 – Fred Evans – All-American – Men's Swimming & Diving
1977 – John Ebito – All-American – Men's Swimming & Diving
1978 – Ken Cyrus – All-American – Second Team Men's Basketball
1979 – Chandler Mackey – All-American – Wrestling
1979 – Joseph Curtis – All-American – Men's Indoor Track & Field
1979 – Joseph Curtis – All-American – Men's Outdoor Track & Field
1979 – Mike Eversley – All-American – Second Team Men's Basketball
1980 – Chandler Mackey – All-American – Wrestling
1980 – Derrick Hardy – All-American – Wrestling
1980 – Ken Dancy – All-American – Second Team Men's Basketball
1981 – Eric Blackmon – All-American – Men's Swimming & Diving
1983 – Jon Jahnke Academic – All-American – Baseball
1983 – Sherrod Arnold – All-American – First Team Men's Basketball
1983 – Stanley Griffin – All-American – First Team Men's Outdoor Track & Field
1984 – Charles Perry – All-Tournament Team – First Team Men's Basketball
1984 – Denise Bullocks – All-American – Women's Outdoor Track & Field
1984 – Denise Bullocks – Outstanding Performer – Women's Outdoor Track & Field
1984 – Denise Bullocks – Scholar-Athlete – Women's Outdoor Track & Field
1984 – Learando Drake – All-American – Third Team Men's Basketball
1984 – Lionel Keys – All-American – Wrestling
1986 – Jimmy McGriff – All-American – Men's Indoor Track & Field
1987 – Chris Garrett – All-American – Men's Outdoor Track & Field
1987 – David Rogan – All-American – Men's Indoor Track & Field
1987 – David Rogan – All-American – Men's Outdoor Track & Field
1987 – Deanail Mitchell – All-American – Men's Indoor Track & Field
1987 – Deanail Mitchell – All-American – Men's Outdoor Track & Field
1987 – Denise Bullocks – All-American – Women's Indoor Track & Field
1987 – Denise Bullocks – All-American – Women's Outdoor Track & Field
1987 – Enos Watts – All-American – Men's Outdoor Track & Field

Notable former athletes
 Deji Akindele, professional basketball player for Yalova Group BelediyeSpor of the Turkish Basketball First League.
 Darron Brittman, former basketball player who is best known as the first officially recognized NCAA Division I season steals leader in 1985–86.
 Josephine D'Angelo, left fielder who played from  through  in the All-American Girls Professional Baseball League. She later earned her masters from CSU.
 James "Chico" Hernandez, FIAS World Cup Vice-Champion in Sombo Wrestling. He graduated from CSU.
 David Holston, basketball player for JDA Dijon Basket of France's LNB Pro A. He played for the Chicago State Cougars men's basketball team.
 Bob Janecyk, goaltender for the Chicago Blackhawks from 1983 to 1984 and the Los Angeles Kings from 1984 to 1989. He played for CSU and graduated in 1978.
 John Mallee, Major League Baseball hitting coach. Mallee is with the Los Angeles Angels. He attended CSU.
 Wayne Molis, professional basketball player who played for the New York Knicks from 1966-1967. He played for the Chicago State Cougars men's basketball team.
 Royce Parran, professional basketball player who last played for Belfius Mons-Hainaut of the Belgian Basketball League. He played for the Chicago State Cougars men's basketball team.
 Clarke Rosenberg (born 1993), American-Israeli basketball player in the Israel Basketball Premier League
 Tony Weeden, professional basketball player. He played for the Chicago State Cougars men's basketball team.
 Willye White, first American track and field athlete to take part in five Olympics, competing on the 1956, 1960, 1964, 1968, and 1972 teams respectively. She graduated from CSU in 1976 with a degree in public health administration.

References

External links